The Fort Wayne Flames were an indoor soccer club based in Fort Wayne, Indiana, that competed in the American Indoor Soccer Association, playing home games at the Allen County War Memorial Coliseum from 1986–1989.

History
The team was founded in by a group of four investors: Bob Britt, Fred Mathews, Jr., James Speed, and William Fahlsing and began play in the 1986–87 season of the American Indoor Soccer Association (AISA). The team reached out to experience by hiring away Pete Mahlock from the Louisville Thunder to be the team General Manager. Former Seattle Sounders (NASL), Cleveland Force (MISL), & Wichita Wings (MISL) goalkeeper and University of Washington coach Cliff Brown was brought in to be the first Head Coach of the franchise.

The inaugural season was one of struggle for the fledgling team. Just five games into the season, Brown was fired and replaced by defenseman Tom Alioto who continued his on field duties as a player/coach. As the team struggled on field, finishing last in the Southern Division with a 13–29 record, it also struggled off field. Despite finishing the season with the fourth-best attendance in the league, the season ended with the franchise having racked up huge losses that left the future in jeopardy.

The franchise would return for the 1987–88 season as remaining investors Mathews and Speed were joined by local businessman Craig Hartman, who with a huge influx of his own money, assumed the role as team President. Retaining Mahlock as GM, the team hired former three-time Indiana University All American, 1978 Hermann Trophy winner, NASL player, and United States Olympian Angelo DiBernardo to become the third Head Coach of the franchise. Although the on field play improved under new leadership, the team suffered and incredible 10 one-goal losses (the rest of the league had 13 one-goal losses combined) en route to a 9–15 record and a last-place finish in the regular season.

Abandoning a traditional playoff format, the AISA instituted a six-team, home-and-away, round robin “Challenge Cup” Series to crown the 1988 post-season champion. Living up the promise they showed in the regular season, the Flames became dominant during the Cup Series, outscoring their opponents 67–46 through the first 11 games and posting an 8–3 record. The final game of the “Challenge Cup” was scheduled for April 1, 1988, with the Flames playing host to the 1984–85 and 1985–86 AISA Champion Canton Invaders. With each team hosting an 8–3 record, the game would be winner-take-all for the Cup. In front of a sellout (and franchise record) crowd of 8,028, the Flames would fall behind early and stage a furious rally late, only to fall to the Invaders 5–4.

Despite gains in the regular season attendance and league-leading playoff attendance, the 1988 off-season was again troublesome for the franchise. Looking to stem the flow of red ink, Hartman restructured the Flames into the only registered not-for-profit sports franchise in the nation. The off-season saw an intense fund-raising operation that included GM Mahlock and players Alan Bodenstein and Bobby Poursanidis living atop a billboard in the heart of downtown to raise both team awareness and funding. The results were impressive as hundreds of fans purchased stock in the team and 27 prominent local business leaders invested in the team to make up the new board of directors.

When DiBernardo decided to leave coaching, the team turned to former MISL standout defenseman Dave MacKenzie to be the fourth Head Coach of the franchise. Entering the position as the (then) all-time leader in MISL games played and with a reputation as a hard-nosed, physical player, the team showed marked improvement under MacKenzie, but continued to struggle in close games. Looking to add some extra spark, MacKenzie became the second player/Coach of the franchise as he activated himself and played in 27 games. Despite improving to a .500 record (20–20) the team missed the playoffs by one game.

The team folded following the 1989 season. Under separate ownership, Fort Wayne was awarded an expansion franchise Indiana Kick, which lasted one additional season (1989–1990).

Year-by-year

Head coaches

Players statistics (regular season)

Players statistics (playoffs) 

 Starting in 1989, the AISA began assigning different point values to goals. All 3-pt., 2-pt, & 1-pt. goals count as one in these stats.

See also 
History of sports in Fort Wayne, Indiana

Defunct indoor soccer clubs in the United States
National Professional Soccer League (1984–2001) teams
Sports in Fort Wayne, Indiana
Soccer clubs in Indiana
American Indoor Soccer Association teams
1986 establishments in Indiana
1989 disestablishments in Indiana